Víctor Felipe Méndez Obando (born 23 September 1999) is a Chilean football player who plays as a midfielder for Russian club CSKA Moscow.

Club career
On 28 July 2022, Méndez signed a three-year contract with Russian Premier League club CSKA Moscow.

International career
At under-20 level, Méndez represented Chile in both the 2018 South American Games, winning the gold medal, and the 2019 South American Championship

Méndez made his debut for the Chile national team on 9 December 2021 in a 2–2 draw against Mexico.

Career statistics

Club

International

Honours
Chile U20
 South American Games Gold medal: 2018

References

External links

Felipe Méndez at PlayMakerStats

1999 births
Living people
People from Valdivia
Chilean footballers
Association football midfielders
Chile under-20 international footballers
Chile international footballers
Unión Española footballers
PFC CSKA Moscow players
Chilean Primera División players
Russian Premier League players
Chilean expatriate footballers
Expatriate footballers in Russia
Chilean expatriate sportspeople in Russia
South American Games gold medalists for Chile
South American Games medalists in football
Competitors at the 2018 South American Games
21st-century Chilean people